Roman Irinarkhovich Tikhomirov (1915-1984) was a Soviet film director and screenwriter. In 1973, he was awarded the title of  People’s Artist of the RSFSR.

Biography 
Roman Tikhomirov was born in 1915 in Saratov.

As a young man, he entered the Saint Petersburg State Conservatory (violin class), and graduated from it in 1941. He then continued his studies, and, in 1945, he graduated from the conductor class of the same conservatory. In parallel with his studies at the Conservatory, he worked as an assistant director on Sergei Gerasimov’s The New Teacher,  Ya.  Protazanov’s Nasreddin in Bukhara, and Mikhail Romm’s Man No. 217. 

His first opera production was the play “The Wolf and the Seven Little Kids” by M. Koval (Conservatory Opera Studio). Starting in 1948, he was Head of the Department of Musical Theaters and Director of the All-Union House of Folk Art named at the Committee on Arts of the USSR. In 1951 he made his debut on the professional stage at the Saratov Opera and Ballet Theater (“May Night” by N. A. Rimsky-Korsakov). In 1952–1956, he was the chief director of the Novosibirsk Opera and Ballet Theater. In 1957-1959 he was the artistic director of the Central Television. In 1958, his first film as a director and screenwriter, Eugene Onegin, was released. Starting in 1960, he was the chairman of the artistic council of the creative association of television films attached to Mosfilm film studio. In 1958–1962, he was a director at Lenfilm. In 1962–1977, he was the chief director of the Leningrad Kirov Opera and Ballet Theater.

Selected filmography 
 1958 —  Eugene Onegin
1959 —  Morning Star
 1960 —  The Queen of Spades 
 1963 —  The Serf Actress
1965 —  When the Song Does Not End
 1969 —  Prince Igor

References

External links 

1915 births
1984 deaths
Soviet film directors
Soviet screenwriters
20th-century screenwriters
People's Artists of the RSFSR
Saint Petersburg Conservatory alumni